Yandex.Disk is a cloud service created by Yandex that lets users store files on “cloud” servers and share them with others online. The service is based on syncing data between different devices. Yandex.Disk was launched in English in June 2012.

Features 
Storage — users can upload and save files. There are no restrictions on the length of time files can be stored. All files are uploaded over an encrypted connection and are checked by an antivirus.

Syncing — files are synced between all the user's internet-enabled devices either through the web interface or the Yandex.Disk mobile/desktop application.

Sharing — users can share file download links with others.

Preview — the built-in flash player lets people preview songs.

Integration with other Yandex services — lets people manage their files on other Yandex services such as Yandex.Mail and Yandex.Narod. All sent and received mail attachments are automatically placed in one folder and can easily be searched.

WebDAV support — means that files can be managed with any application supporting the WebDAV protocol. The Yandex.Disk API can be used in any software program supporting WebDAV.

Since October 18, 2019, Yandex.Disk has started throttling WebDAV, causing some clients to time out, the official page redirects to the Yandex.Disk 3.0 client page, support writes: 
“Yandex.Disk is a personal service that is not designed to be used as an infrastructure element. For such tasks, we have Yandex.Cloud"

Supported platforms
Web version

Located inside Yandex.Mail under the “Files” tab.

 Desktop application 

There are applications available for the following operating systems:
 Windows XP SP3, Windows Vista, Windows 7, Windows 10
 macOS
 command line version for Linux

 Mobile version 

The mobile version is available as its own app for: 
 iOS
 Android

The mobile app lets users view files on Yandex.Disk, upload files from their mobile device, download files for use offline and email file download links.

Yandex.disk api 
The Yandex.Disk API makes it easier to sync info between smartphones, tablet PCs, laptops and desktop computers.

The API lets developers:
 manage Yandex.Disk user files
 store files created by developers’ own software
 store application settings and use them on any internet-enabled device
The Yandex.Disk API Documentation was released on April 28, 2012.

Storage
The service is provided completely free of charge. 
Everyone starts off with a free allowance of 10GB, which can be increased by 512 Mb increments by referring others to an additional maximum of 10 GB for 20 GB in total. Also, additional storage can be paid for on a monthly or yearly basis.

Users can choose to enable device auto-uploads using the Yandex.Disk App on Android and iOS for an additional 32 GB of free storage. This increases the maximum storage from 10 GB to 42 GB.

History 
April 5, 2012 – the beta version of the service was launched.

May 3, 2012 – the first API and open source client are launched.

May 24, 2012 – a flash player was introduced to the web interface and a “Save to my Disk” button was added to the shared file page, which allows users to share files published by others to their account.

June 26, 2012 – English and Turkish versions available.

See also 
 Yandex
 Cloud computing
 Comparison of file hosting services
 Comparison of online backup services

References

External links 
 

Yandex
Cloud applications
Data synchronization
Email attachment replacements
File hosting
File sharing services
Online backup services
File hosting for Linux
File hosting for macOS
File hosting for Windows